Louis Charles Tillaye (31 May 1847 – 7 May 1913) was a French politician of the Third French Republic. He was Minister of Public works (28 June – 17 September 1898) in the government of Henri Brisson.

Sources 
 

1847 births
1913 deaths
People of the French Third Republic
Politicians from Normandy
People from Orne
Senators of Calvados (department)